Euphorbia is a highly diverse plant genus, comprising some 5,000 currently accepted taxa.

This is an alphabetical list of the Euphorbia species and notable intraspecific taxa.

The list includes the former (and never generally accepted) genus Chamaesyce, as well as the related genera Elaeophorbia, Endadenium, Monadenium, Synadenium and Pedilanthus which according to recent DNA sequence-based phylogenetic studies are all nested within Euphorbia

Noticeably succulent plants are marked by (s).

G

Euphorbia gaditana Coss.
Euphorbia gaillardotii Boiss. & Blanche ex Boiss.
Euphorbia galapagaia B.L.Rob. & Greenm.
Euphorbia galgalana S.Carter (s)
Euphorbia galiciana McVaugh
Euphorbia gamkensis Marx (s)
Euphorbia garanbiensis Hayata
Euphorbia garberi Engelm. ex Chapm.
Euphorbia gariepina  Boiss. (s)
Euphorbia gariepina ssp. balsamea  (Welw. ex Hiern) L.C.Leach (s)
Euphorbia gariepina ssp. gariepina (s)
Euphorbia garkeana Boiss.
Euphorbia garuana N.E.Br.
Euphorbia gasparrinii  Boiss.
Euphorbia gatbergensis N.E.Br. (s)
Euphorbia gaubae (Soják) Radcl.-Sm.
Euphorbia gaubae var. gaubae
Euphorbia gaubae var. velutina (Bornm. & Gauba) Oudejans
Euphorbia gaudichaudii  Boiss.
Euphorbia gaumeri Millsp.
Euphorbia gayi  Salis
Euphorbia gebelica Brullo
Euphorbia gedrosiaca Rech.f., Aellen & Esfand. ex Rech.f.
Euphorbia geldorensis S.Carter (s)
Euphorbia gemmea P.R.O.Bally & S.Carter (s)
Euphorbia genistoides Bergius
Euphorbia genoudiana Ursch & Leandri (s)
Euphorbia gentilis N.E.Br. (s)
Euphorbia gentilis ssp. gentilis (s)
Euphorbia gentilis ssp. tanquana L.C.Leach (s)
Euphorbia gentryi V.W.Steinm. & T.F.Daniel (s)
Euphorbia georgei Oudejans
Euphorbia germainii Phil.
Euphorbia geroldii Rauh (s)
Euphorbia geyeri Engelm. ex Engelm. & A.Gray
Euphorbia giessii L.C.Leach (s)
Euphorbia gillettii P.R.O.Bally & S.Carter (s)
Euphorbia gillettii ssp. gillettii (s)
Euphorbia gillettii ssp. tenuior S.Carter (s)
Euphorbia giumboensis A.Hässl. (s)
Euphorbia glaberrima K.Koch
Euphorbia glabriflora Vis. ex Vis. & Pančić
Euphorbia gladiata (P.R.O.Bally) Bruyns (s) (= Monadenium yattanum var. gladiatum, Monadenium gladiatum)
Euphorbia glandularis L.C.Leach & G.Will. (s)
Euphorbia glanduligera Pax
Euphorbia glauca G.Forst. (s)
Euphorbia glaucescens Willd.
Euphorbia glaucopoda Diels
Euphorbia globosa (Haw.) Sims (s) - Globose spurge
Euphorbia globulicaulis S.Carter (s)
Euphorbia glochidiata Pax (s)
Euphorbia glomerulans (Prokh.) Prokh.
Euphorbia glytosperma Engelm.
Euphorbia godana Buddens., Lawant, & Lavranos (s)
Euphorbia goetzei Pax (s)
Euphorbia goliana Comm. ex Lam.
Euphorbia golondrina L.C.Wheeler
Euphorbia gorenflotii Mobayen
Euphorbia gorgonis A.Berger (s)
Euphorbia gossypina Pax (s)
Euphorbia gossypina ssp. gossypina (s)
Euphorbia gossypina ssp. gossypina var. coccinea Pax (s)
Euphorbia gossypina ssp. gossypina var. gossypina (s)
Euphorbia gossypina ssp. mangulensis S.Carter (s)
Euphorbia gottlebei Rauh (s)
Euphorbia goudotii Boiss. (s)
Euphorbia goyazensis Boiss. (s)
Euphorbia gracilicaulis L.C.Leach (s)
Euphorbia gracilior Cronquist
Euphorbia graciliramea Pax (s)
Euphorbia gracillima S.Watson
Euphorbia gradyi V.W.Steinm. & Ram.-Roa (s)
Euphorbia graminea Jacq. - Grassleaf spurge
Euphorbia graminifolia Vill.
Euphorbia graminifolia ssp. graminifolia
Euphorbia graminifolia ssp. tommasiniana (Bertoloni) Oudejans
Euphorbia graminifolia ssp. zhiguliensis (Prokh.) Oudejans
Euphorbia grammata (McVaugh) Oudejans
Euphorbia grandialata R.A.Dyer (s)
Euphorbia grandicornis Goebel ex N.E.Br. (s)
Euphorbia grandicornis ssp. grandicornis (s)
Euphorbia grandicornis ssp. sejuncta L.C.Leach (s)
Euphorbia grandidens Haw. (s)
Euphorbia grandidieri Baillon
Euphorbia grandifolia Haw. (s) (= Elaeophorbia grandifolia)
Euphorbia grandiloba Chiov.
Euphorbia graniticola L.C.Leach (s)
Euphorbia grantii Oliver (s) - African milk bush
Euphorbia granulata Forssk.
Euphorbia greenwayi P.R.O.Bally & S.Carter (s)
Euphorbia greenwayi ssp. breviaculeata S.Carter (s)
Euphorbia greenwayi ssp. greenwayi (s)
Euphorbia gregaria Marloth (s)
Euphorbia gregersenii K.Maly ex Beck
Euphorbia griffithii Hook.f.
Euphorbia grisea Engelm. ex Boiss.
Euphorbia griseola Pax (s)
Euphorbia griseola ssp. griseola (s)
Euphorbia griseola ssp. mashonica L.C.Leach (s)
Euphorbia griseola ssp. zambiensis L.C.Leach (s)
Euphorbia grisophylla M.S.Khan
Euphorbia groenewaldii R.A.Dyer (s)
Euphorbia grosseri Pax (s)
Euphorbia grossheimii (Prokh.) Prokh.
Euphorbia guadalajarana S.Watson
Euphorbia guanarensis Pittier
Euphorbia guatemalensis Standl. & Steyerm. (s)
Euphorbia gueinzii Boiss. (s)
Euphorbia gueinzii var. albovillosa (Pax) N.E.Br. (s)
Euphorbia gueinzii var. gueinzii (s)
Euphorbia guentheri (Pax) Bruyns (s) (= Monadenium guentheri)
Euphorbia guerichiana Pax ex Engl. (s)
Euphorbia guiengola W.R.Buck & Huft (s)
Euphorbia guillauminiana Boiteau (s)
Euphorbia guineensis Brot. ex N.E.Br.
Euphorbia gulestanica Podlech
Euphorbia gumaroi J.Meyrán (s)
Euphorbia gummifera Boiss. (s)
Euphorbia guntensis (Prokh.) Prokh.
Euphorbia guyoniana Boiss. & Reut.
Euphorbia gymnadenia Urb.
Euphorbia gymnocalycioides M.G.Gilbert & S.Carter (s)
Euphorbia gymnoclada Engelm. (s)
Euphorbia gymnota Urb.
Euphorbia gypsicola Rech.f. & Aellen ex Rech.f.
Euphorbia gypsophila S.Carter

H

Euphorbia hadramautica Baker (s)
Euphorbia haeleeleana – Kauaʻi spurge (s)
Euphorbia haematantha Boiss.
Euphorbia hainanensis Croizat (s)
Euphorbia hajhirensis Radcl.-Sm. (s)
Euphorbia hakutosanensis Hurus.
Euphorbia halemanui Sherff
Euphorbia halipedicola L.C.Leach (s)
Euphorbia hallii R.A.Dyer (s)
Euphorbia hamaderoensis A.G.Mill
Euphorbia hamata (Haw.) Sweet (s)
Euphorbia hamiltonii Oudejans
Euphorbia handeniensis S.Carter (s)
Euphorbia handiensis Burchard (s)
Euphorbia hararensis Pax
Euphorbia harmandii Gagnep.
Euphorbia hartwegiana Boiss.
Euphorbia hassleriana Chodat
Euphorbia hausknechtii Boiss.
Euphorbia hebecarpa Boiss.
Euphorbia hedigeriana (Malaisse & Lecron) Bruyns (= Monadenium hedigerianum) (s)
Euphorbia hedyotoides (s)
Euphorbia heishuiensis W.T.Wang
Euphorbia helenae Urb. (s)
Euphorbia helenae ssp. grandifolia Borhidi & O.Muñiz
Euphorbia helenae ssp. helenae
Euphorbia heleniana Thell. & Stapf
Euphorbia helioscopia – Sun spurge
Euphorbia helleri Millsp. – Heller's spurge
Euphorbia helwigii Urb. & Ekman
Euphorbia henricksonii M.C.Johnst.
Euphorbia henryi Hemsl.
Euphorbia hepatica Urb. & Ekman
Euphorbia heptagona L. (s)
Euphorbia heptagona var. dentata (A.Berger) N.E.Br.
Euphorbia heptagona var. heptagona
Euphorbia heptagona var. ramosa A.C.White, R.A.Dyer & B.Sloane
Euphorbia heptagona var. subsessilis A.C.White, R.A.Dyer & B.Sloane
Euphorbia heptagona var. viridis A.C.White, R.A.Dyer & B.Sloane
Euphorbia heptapotamica V.P.Goloskokov
Euphorbia herman-schwartzii (s)
Euphorbia heraldiana (Millsp.) Oudejans
Euphorbia herbacea (Pax) Bruyns (= Monadenium herbaceum) (s)
Euphorbia herbstii (W.L.Wagner) Oudejans
Euphorbia herniariifolia Willd.
Euphorbia herrei A.C.White, R.A.Dyer & B.Sloane (s)
Euphorbia herteri Arechav.
Euphorbia heteradena Jaub. & Spach
Euphorbia heterochroma Pax (s)
Euphorbia heterochroma ssp. heterochroma
Euphorbia heterochroma ssp. tsavoensis S.Carter
Euphorbia heterodoxa Müll.Arg. (s)
Euphorbia heterophylla – Painted Euphorbia, Desert Poinsettia, (Mexican) Fireplant, Paint Leaf, Kaliko
Euphorbia heteropoda Pax  (= Monadenium heteropodum) (s)
Euphorbia heteropoda var. formosa (P.R.O.Bally) Bruyns (= Monadenium heteropodum var. formosum, Monadenium schubei var. formosum)
Euphorbia heteropoda var. heteropoda (= Monadenium heteropodum var. heteropodum)
Euphorbia heterospina S.Carter (s)
Euphorbia heterospina ssp. baringoensis S.Carter
Euphorbia heterospina ssp. heterospina
Euphorbia hexadenia
Euphorbia hexagona Nutt. ex Spreng. – Six-angled spurge
Euphorbia hexagonoides S.Watson
Euphorbia heyligersiana P.I.Forst. (s)
Euphorbia heyneana Spreng.
Euphorbia hiernii (Croizat) Oudejans (= Elaeophorbia hiernii) (s)
Euphorbia hieroglyphica Coss. & Durieu ex Boiss.
Euphorbia hieronymi Subils
Euphorbia hierosolymitana Boiss. (s)
Euphorbia hierosolymitana var. hierosolymitana
Euphorbia hierosolymitana var. ramanensis (B.Baum) Zohary
Euphorbia hildebrandtii
Euphorbia hillebrandii H.Lév.
Euphorbia himalayensis  (Klotzsch & Garcke) Boiss.
Euphorbia hinkleyorum I.M.Johnst. (s)
Euphorbia hintonii L.C.Wheeler (s)
Euphorbia hippocrepica Hemsl.
Euphorbia hirsuta L.
Euphorbia hirsuta var. hirsuta
Euphorbia hirsuta var. leucotricha (Boiss.) Oudejans
Euphorbia hirta L. (= Chamaesyce hirta)
Euphorbia hirta var. hirta
Euphorbia hirtella Boiss.
Euphorbia hispida Boiss.
Euphorbia hockii De Wild.
Euphorbia hoffmanniana  (Klotzsch & Garcke) Boiss. (s)
Euphorbia hondurana Standl. & L.O.Williams
Euphorbia hofstaetteri (s)
Euphorbia holmesiae Lavranos (s)
Euphorbia holochlorina Rizzini (s)
Euphorbia hooveri L.C.Wheeler
Euphorbia hopetownensis Nel (s)
Euphorbia hormorrhiza Radcl.-Sm. (s)
Euphorbia horombensis (s)
Euphorbia horrida Boiss. (s)
Euphorbia horrida var. horrida
Euphorbia horrida var. major A.C.White, R.A.Dyer & B.Sloane
Euphorbia horrida var. noorsvedensis A.C.White, R.A.Dyer & B.Sloane
Euphorbia horrida var. striata A.C.White, R.A.Dyer & B.Sloane
Euphorbia horwoodii S.Carter & Lavranos (s)
Euphorbia hottentotoa Marloth (s)
Euphorbia hsinchuensis (S.C.Lin & Chaw) C.Y.Wu & J.S.Ma
Euphorbia huanchahana (Klotzsch & Garcke ex Klotzsch) Boiss. (s)
Euphorbia huanchahana ssp. huanchahana
Euphorbia huanchahana ssp. penazuelensis Croizat
Euphorbia hubertii Pax (s)
Euphorbia humayensis Brandegee
Euphorbia humbertii
Euphorbia humifusa Willd.
Euphorbia humilis C.A.Mey. ex Ledeb.
Euphorbia humistrata Engelm. ex A.Gray
Euphorbia hunzikeri Subils
Euphorbia hurusawae Oudejans
Euphorbia hurusawae Oudejans
Euphorbia hurusawae var. hurusawae Oudejans
Euphorbia hurusawae var. imaii (Hurus.) Oudejans
Euphorbia hyberna L. – Irish spurge
Euphorbia hyberna ssp. canuti (Parl.) Tutin
Euphorbia hyberna ssp. gibelliana (Peola) M.Raffaelli
Euphorbia hyberna ssp. hyberna
Euphorbia hyberna ssp. insularis (Boiss.) J.I.Briquet
Euphorbia hylonoma Hand.-Mazz.
Euphorbia hypericifolia L.
Euphorbia hypogaea Marloth (s)
Euphorbia hyssopifolia L. (= Chamaesyce hyssopifolia)
Euphorbia hyssopifolia var. blanchetii (Miq. ex Boiss.) Oudejans
Euphorbia hyssopifolia var. hyssopifolia
Euphorbia hyssopifolia var. paraguayensis (Chodat) Oudejans
Euphorbia hyssopifolia var. pruinosa (Chodat) Oudejans
Euphorbia hyssopifolia var. pubescenticocca Christenh.
Euphorbia hyssopifolia var. pulchella (Kunth) Oudejans
Euphorbia hyssopifolia var. uniflora (Chodat & Hassl.) Oudejans

I

Euphorbia iancannellii Bruyns (= Monadenium cannellii) (s)
Euphorbia iberica Boiss.
Euphorbia iharanae Rauh (s)
Euphorbia imerina Cremers (s)
Euphorbia imitata N.E.Br. (s)
Euphorbia immersa P.R.O.Bally & S.Carter (s)
Euphorbia imparispina S.Carter (s)
Euphorbia impressa Chiov.
Euphorbia inaequilatera Sond.
Euphorbia inaequilatera var. dentata (N.E.Br.) M.G.Gilbert
Euphorbia inaequilatera var. inaequilatera
Euphorbia inaequilatera var. jemenica (Schweinf.) Oudejans
Euphorbia inaequilatera var. spanothrix S.Carter
Euphorbia inaequispina N.E.Br. (s)
Euphorbia inaguaensis Oudejans
Euphorbia inappendiculata Domin
Euphorbia inarticulata Schweinf.
Euphorbia incerta Brandegee (= Chamaesyce incerta)
Euphorbia inciformis Sessé & Moc.
Euphorbia inconstantia R.A.Dyer
Euphorbia inculta P.R.O.Bally (s)
Euphorbia indecora N.E.Br. (s)
Euphorbia inderiensis Less. ex Kar. & Kir.
Euphorbia indica Lam.
Euphorbia indistincta P.I.Forst. (s)
Euphorbia indivisa (Engelm.) Tidestr.
Euphorbia indurescens L.C.Leach (s)
Euphorbia inermis P.Miller (s)
Euphorbia inermis var. huttoniae A.C.White, R.A.Dyer & B.Sloane (s)
Euphorbia inermis var. inermis (s)
Euphorbia infesta Pax
Euphorbia inflexa Urb. & Ekman
Euphorbia ingens E.Mey. ex Boiss. – Naboom, "Candelabra tree"
Euphorbia ingenticapsa L.C.Leach (s)
Euphorbia innocua L.C.Wheller – Velvet spurge
Euphorbia inornata N.E.Br. (s)
Euphorbia insarmentosa G.P.Meyer
Euphorbia insulana Vell. (s)
Euphorbia insulana var. insulana (s)
Euphorbia insulana var. pilcomayensis Croizat (s)
Euphorbia insulana var. tovarenis  (Boiss.) Oudejans (s)
Euphorbia interaxillaris Fernald
Euphorbia intisy Drake (s)
Euphorbia intricata S.Carter (s)
Euphorbia inundata Torr. ex Chapm. – Florida pineland spurge
Euphorbia inundata var. inundata
Euphorbia inundata var. garrettii E.L.Bridges & Orzell
Euphorbia inundaticola L.C.Leach (s)
Euphorbia invaginata  Croizat (s)
Euphorbia invenusta (N.E.Br.) Bruyns (= Monadenium invenustum) (s)
Euphorbia invenusta var. angusta (P.R.O.Bally) Bruyns (= Monadenium invenustum var. angustum)
Euphorbia invenusta var. invenusta (= Monadenium invenustum var. invenustum
Euphorbia ipecacuanhae L. – American Ipecac
Euphorbia irgisensis  Litv.
Euphorbia isacantha Pax (s)
Euphorbia isaloensis Drake (s)
Euphorbia isatidifolia Lam. (s)
Euphorbia isaurica M.S.Khan
Euphorbia isophylla Bornm.
Euphorbia itremensis Kimnach & Lavranos (s)
Euphorbia ivanjohnstonii M.C.Johnst.

J

Euphorbia jacquemontii Boiss.
Euphorbia jacquinii Boiss.
Euphorbia jaliscensis B.L.Rob. & Greenm. (s)
Euphorbia jamesonii Boiss.
Euphorbia jansenvillensis Nel (s)
Euphorbia jasiewiczii (Chrtek & Křísa) Radcl.-Sm.
Euphorbia jatrophoides Pax (s)
Euphorbia jejuna M.C.Johnst. & Warnock
Euphorbia jenisseiensis K.S.Baikov
Euphorbia jessonii Oudejans
Euphorbia johannis S.Carter (s)
Euphorbia johnstonii Mayfield (s)
Euphorbia jolkinii Boiss.
Euphorbia josei  Oudejans - Jose spurge
Euphorbia jovettii Huguet
Euphorbia joyae P.R.O.Bally & S.Carter (s)
Euphorbia jubata L.C.Leach
Euphorbia juglans Compton (s)
Euphorbia juttae Dinter (s)
Euphorbia juvoklanti Pax (s)

K

Euphorbia kaessneri Pax (s)
"Euphorbia kaessneri" (N.E.Br.) Bruyns 2006 (non Pax: preoccupied) (s) (= Monadenium kaessneri)
Euphorbia kalaharica Marloth
Euphorbia kalisana S.Carter (s)
Euphorbia kamerunica Pax (s)
Euphorbia kamponii Rauh & Petignat (s)
Euphorbia kanalensis Boiss. (s)
Euphorbia kanaorica Boiss.
Euphorbia kanglingensis W.T.Wang
Euphorbia kansuensis Prokh.
Euphorbia kansui Liou ex S.B.Ho
Euphorbia kaokoensis  (A.C.White, R.A.Dyer & B.Sloane) L.C.Leach (s)
Euphorbia karibensis S.Carter
Euphorbia karoi Freyn
Euphorbia karroensis  (Boiss.) N.E.Br. (s)
Euphorbia karwinskyi Boiss.
Euphorbia katrajensis Gage
Euphorbia keithii R.A.Dyer (s)
Euphorbia kelleri Pax (s)
Euphorbia kelleri var. kelleri (s)
Euphorbia kelleri var. latifolia Pax (s)
Euphorbia kemulariae Ter-Chatschat.
Euphorbia kerrii Craib (s)
Euphorbia kerstingii Pax
Euphorbia khandallensis Blatt. & Hallb. (s)
Euphorbia khasyana Boiss.
Euphorbia kilwana N.E.Br.
Euphorbia kimberleyana (G.Will.) Bruyns (s) (= Monadenium kimberleyanum)
Euphorbia kimmerica Lipsky ex Grossh.
Euphorbia kirimzjulica Stepanov
Euphorbia kiritensis P.R.O.Bally & S.Carter (s)
Euphorbia kirkii (N.E.Br.) Bruyns (s) (= Synadenium kirkii)
Euphorbia kischenensis Vierh. (s)
Euphorbia kitawagae (Hurus.) Kitag.
Euphorbia klokovii Dubovik ex Dubovik et al.
Euphorbia klotzschii Oudejans
Euphorbia klotzschii var. argentina (Müll.Arg ex Griseb.) Oudejans
Euphorbia klotzschii var. dentata (R.E.Fr.) Oudejans
Euphorbia klotzschii var. klotzschii
Euphorbia klotzschii var. schizosepala (Boiss.) Oudejans
Euphorbia knobelii Letty (s)
Euphorbia knuthii Pax (s)
Euphorbia knuthii ssp. johnsonii  (N.E.Br.) L.C.Leach (s)
Euphorbia knuthii ssp. knuthii (s)
Euphorbia koerneriana Allem & Irgang
Euphorbia komaroviana Prokh.
Euphorbia kondoi Rauh & Razaf. (s)
Euphorbia kopetdaghii (Prokh.) Prokh.
Euphorbia kotovii Klokov ex Dubovik & Klokov
Euphorbia kotschyana Fenzl
Euphorbia kouandensis Beille ex A.Chev.
Euphorbia kozlovii Prokh.
Euphorbia kraussiana Bernh. ex C.Krauss
Euphorbia kudrjaschevii Prokh.
Euphorbia kundelunguensis (Malaisse) Bruyns (s) (= Monadenium kundelunguense)
Euphorbia kuriensis Vierh. (s)
Euphorbia kurtzii Subils
Euphorbia kuwaleana O.Deg. & Sherff

L

Euphorbia labatii Rauh & Bard.-Vauc. (s)
Euphorbia lacei Craib (s)
Euphorbia lacera Boiss.
Euphorbia laciniata Panigrahi
Euphorbia lactea Haw. (s) - Elkhorn, frilled fan, mottled spurge
Euphorbia lactiflua Phil. (s)
Euphorbia laevigata Lam.
Euphorbia lagascae Spreng.
Euphorbia lagunensis Huft
Euphorbia laikipiensis S.Carter
Euphorbia lamarckii Sweet (s)
Euphorbia lambii Svent. (s)
Euphorbia lancasteriana Radcl.-Sm.
Euphorbia lancifolia  Schltdl. (s) – Ixbut
Euphorbia laredana Millsp.
Euphorbia larica Boiss. (s)
Euphorbia larranagae Oudejans
Euphorbia lasiocarpa Klotzsch
Euphorbia lata Engelm.
Euphorbia latazi Kunth
Euphorbia latericolor Brandegee (s)
Euphorbia lateriflora Schumach. & Thonn. (s)
Euphorbia lathyris L. - Caper spurge, gopher spurge
Euphorbia latifolia C.A.Mey. ex Ledeb.
Euphorbia laurifolia Lam. (s)
Euphorbia lavicola S.Carter (s)
Euphorbia lavrani L.C.Leach (s)
Euphorbia laxa Drake
Euphorbia leandriana Boiteau (s)
Euphorbia lecheoides Millsp.
Euphorbia lecheoides var. lecheoides
Euphorbia lecheoides var. exumensis (Millsp.) Oudejans
Euphorbia lecheoides var. wilsonii (Millsp.) Oudejans
Euphorbia ledermanniana Pax & K.Hoffmann (s)
Euphorbia ledienii A.Berger (s)
Euphorbia ledienii var. dregei N.E.Br. (s)
Euphorbia ledienii var. ledienii (s)
Euphorbia leistneri R.H.Archer (s)
Euphorbia lemaireana Boiss. (s)
Euphorbia lenensis K.S.Baikov
Euphorbia lenewtonii S.Carter (s)
Euphorbia leonardii (D.G.Burch) Radcl.-Sm.
Euphorbia leoncroizatii Oudejans
Euphorbia leonensis N.E.Br. (s)
Euphorbia leontopoda S.Carter (s)
Euphorbia leptocaula Boiss.
Euphorbia leptoclada Balf.f. (s)
Euphorbia leshumensis N.E.Br.
Euphorbia letestuana (Denis) Bruyns (s) (= Monadenium letestuanum)
Euphorbia letestui J.Raynal (s)
Euphorbia leucantha  (Klotzsch & Garcke ex Klotzsch) Boiss.
Euphorbia leucocephala Lotsy (s) - Pascuita, white-laced euphorbia
Euphorbia leucochlamys Chiov. (s)
Euphorbia leucodendron Drake (s)
Euphorbia leucodendron ssp. leucodendron (s)
Euphorbia leucodendron ssp. oncoclada  (Drake) Rauh & Koutnik (s)
Euphorbia leuconeura Boiss. (s)
Euphorbia leucophylla Benth. (s)
Euphorbia leucophylla ssp. comcaacorum V.W.Steinm. & Felger (s)
Euphorbia leucophylla ssp. leucophylla (s)
Euphorbia levis Poir.
Euphorbia lignosa Marloth (s)
Euphorbia ligularia Roxb.
Euphorbia ligustrina Boiss.
Euphorbia limaensis Oudejans
Euphorbia limpopoana S.Carter (s)
Euphorbia lindenii (S.Carter) Bruyns (s) (= Monadenium lindenii)
Euphorbia linearibracteata L.C.Leach (s)
Euphorbia lineata S.Watson
Euphorbia lingiana C.Shih ex Chun
Euphorbia linguiformis McVaugh
Euphorbia linguiformis var. actinadenia (McVaugh) Oudejans
Euphorbia linguiformis var. linguiformis
Euphorbia lingulata Heuff.
Euphorbia linifolia L.
Euphorbia lipskyi (Prokh.) Prokh.
Euphorbia lissosperma S.Carter
Euphorbia liukiuensis Hayata
Euphorbia livida E.Mey. ex Boiss.
Euphorbia lividiflora L.C.Leach (s)
Euphorbia loadensis N.E.Br.
Euphorbia lomelii V.W.Steinm. (s) (= Pedilanthus macrocarpus)
Euphorbia longecorniculata Kitam.
Euphorbia longecornuta S.Watson
Euphorbia longicruris  Scheele - Wedgeleaf spurge
Euphorbia longifolia Lam. (s)
Euphorbia longinsulicola S.R.Hill (s)
Euphorbia longispina Chiov. (s)
Euphorbia longistyla Boiss.
Euphorbia longituberculosa Boiss. (s)
Euphorbia lophiosperma S.Carter
Euphorbia lophogonaLam. (s) – Randramboay
Euphorbia lophogona var. lophogona (s)
Euphorbia lophogona var. tenuicaulisRauh (s)
Euphorbia loricataLam. (s)
Euphorbia louwii L.C.Leach (s)
Euphorbia luapulana L.C.Leach (s)
Euphorbia lucida Waldst. & Kit. - Shining spurge
Euphorbia luciismithii B.L.Rob. & Greenm. (s)
Euphorbia lucorum Rupr.
Euphorbia ludoviciana Raf.
Euphorbia lugardiae (N.E.Br.) Bruyns (s) (= Monadenium lugardiae)
Euphorbia lukoseana S.Carter (s)
Euphorbia lumbricalis L.C.Leach (s)
Euphorbia lundelliana Croizat ex Lundell (s)
Euphorbia lunulata Bunge
Euphorbia lupatensis N.E.Br.
Euphorbia lupulina Boiss. (s)
Euphorbia lurida Engelm.
Euphorbia luteoviridis D.G.Long
Euphorbia luticola Hand.-Mazz.
Euphorbia lutosa S.Carter
Euphorbia lutulenta (Croizat) Oudejans
Euphorbia luzoniensis E.D.Merrill
Euphorbia lycioides Boiss. (s)
Euphorbia lydenburgensis Schweik. & Letty (s)

M

Euphorbia macella N.E.Br. (s)
Euphorbia macgillivrayi Boiss.
Euphorbia machrisiae Steyerm.
Euphorbia macinensis Prodan
Euphorbia macra Hiern
Euphorbia macraulonia Phil. (s)
Euphorbia macrocarpa Boiss.
Euphorbia macroceras Fisch. & C.A.Mey.
Euphorbia macroclada Boiss.
Euphorbia macroglypha Lem. (s)
Euphorbia macrophylla Pax (s)
Euphorbia macropodoides B.L.Rob. & Greenm. (s)
Euphorbia macropus  (Klotzsch & Garcke) Boiss. (s) - Huachuca mountain spurge
Euphorbia macrorrhiza C.A.Mey. ex Ledeb.
Euphorbia maculata  L. (s) - Spotted spurge
Euphorbia macvaughiana M.C.Johnst.
Euphorbia macvaughii Carvajal & Lomeli ex Carvajal
Euphorbia maddenii Boiss.
Euphorbia mafingensis (Hargreaves) Bruyns (s) (= Monadenium mafingense)
Euphorbia magdalenae Benth. (s)
Euphorbia magnicapsula S.Carter (s)
Euphorbia magnicapsula var. lacterosa S.Carter (s)
Euphorbia magnicapsula var. magnicapsula (s)
Euphorbia magnifica (E.A.Bruce) Bruyns (s) (= Monadenium magnificum)
Euphorbia mahabobokensis Rauh (s)
Euphorbia mahafalensis Denis (s)
Euphorbia mahafalensis var. mahafalensis (s)
Euphorbia mahafalensis var. xanthadenia (Denis) Leandri (s)
Euphorbia mainty Denis ex Leandri (s)
Euphorbia maieri H.Lév.
Euphorbia makallensis S.Carter (s)
Euphorbia maleolens Phillips (s)
Euphorbia malevola L.C.Leach (s)
Euphorbia malleata Boiss.
Euphorbia malurensis Rech.f.
Euphorbia malvana Maire
Euphorbia mamfwensis (Malaisse & Lecron) Bruyns (s) (= Monadenium mamfwense)
Euphorbia mammillaris L. (s) - Corn cob euphorbia
Euphorbia mananarensis Leandri (s)
Euphorbia mancinella Baillon
Euphorbia mandrariensis Drake (s)
Euphorbia mandravioky Leandri (s)
Euphorbia mandshurica Maxim.
Euphorbia mangleti Urb.
Euphorbia mangelsdorffii Rauh (s)
Euphorbia mangokyensis Denis (s)
Euphorbia mangorensis Leandri
Euphorbia marayensis Subils
Euphorbia maresii Knoche
Euphorbia margalidiana ;Kuhbier & Lewej. ex Kuhbier (s)
Euphorbia margaretae S.Carter (s)
Euphorbia marginata Pursh - Snow-on-the-mountain, variegated spurge, white-margined spurge
Euphorbia marianoi Oudejans
Euphorbia marie-cladieae Rzepecky
Euphorbia marilandica Greene
Euphorbia maritae Rauh (s)
Euphorbia marlothiana N.E.Br. (s)
Euphorbia marrupana Bruyns (s)
Euphorbia marsabitensis S.Carter (s)
Euphorbia marshalliana Boiss.
Euphorbia marshalliana ssp. marshalliana
Euphorbia marshalliana ssp. armenae (Prokh.) Oudejans
Euphorbia martinae Rauh (s)
Euphorbia masirahensis S.A.Ghazanfar (s)
Euphorbia matabelensis Pax (s)
Euphorbia matritensis Boiss.
Euphorbia mauritanica  L. (s)
Euphorbia mauritanica var. corallothamnus Dinter ex A.C.White, R.A.Dyer & B.Sloane (s)
Euphorbia mauritanica var. foetens Dinter ex A.C.White, R.A.Dyer & B.Sloane (s)
Euphorbia mauritanica var. lignosa A.C.White, R.A.Dyer & B.Sloane (s)
Euphorbia mauritanica var. mauritanica  (s)
Euphorbia mauritanica var. minor A.C.White, R.A.Dyer & B.Sloane (s)
Euphorbia mauritanica var. namaquensis N.E.Br. (s)
Euphorbia maysillesii McVaugh
Euphorbia mayurnathanii Croizat (s)
Euphorbia mazarronensis Esteve Chueca
Euphorbia mazatlamensis Oudejans
Euphorbia mazicum Emb. & Maire
Euphorbia medicaginea Boiss.
Euphorbia meenae S.Carter (s)
Euphorbia megalatlantica J.Ball
Euphorbia megalocarpa Rech.f.
Euphorbia melanadenia Torr.
Euphorbia melanocarpa Boiss.
Euphorbia melanohydrata Nel (s)
Euphorbia melapetala Gasparr.
Euphorbia melitensis Parl. (s)
Euphorbia meloformis Aiton (s)
Euphorbia meloformis ssp. meloformis (s) - Melon spurge
Euphorbia meloformis ssp. valida  (N.E.Br.) G.D.Rowley (s)
Euphorbia memoralis R.A.Dyer (s)
Euphorbia mendezii Boiss.
Euphorbia menelikii Pax
Euphorbia mercurialina Michx. - Mercury spurge
Euphorbia meridensis Pittier
Euphorbia meridionalis P.R.O.Bally & S.Carter (s)
Euphorbia mertonii Fosberg
Euphorbia mesembryanthemifolia Jacq. (s)
Euphorbia meuleniana Schwartz (s)
Euphorbia meuselii Geltman
Euphorbia mexiae Standl.
Euphorbia meyeniana Klotzsch
Euphorbia meyeriana Galushko
Euphorbia micracantha Boiss. (s)
Euphorbia micractina Boiss.
Euphorbia micradenia Boiss.
Euphorbia microcarpa (Prokh.) P.Klylov
Euphorbia microcephala Boiss.
Euphorbia microclada Urb.
Euphorbia micromera Boiss. ex Engelm.
Euphorbia microsciadia Boiss.
Euphorbia microsperma (Murb.) Maly
Euphorbia microsphaera Boiss.
Euphorbia migiurtinorum Chiov. (s)
Euphorbia milii  Desmoul. (s) - Crown-of-thorns, christplant
Euphorbia milii var. bevilaniensis  (Croizat) Ursch & Leandri (s)
Euphorbia milii var. hislopii  (N.E.Br.) Ursch & Leandri (s)
Euphorbia milii var. imperatae  (Leandri) Ursch & Leandri (s)
Euphorbia milii var. longifolia  Rauh (s)
Euphorbia milii var. milii
Euphorbia milii var. splendens  (Bojer ex Hook.) Ursch & Leandri (s)
Euphorbia milii var. tananarivae  (Leandri) Ursch & Leandri (s)
Euphorbia milii var. tenuispina  Rauh & Razaf. (s)
Euphorbia milii var. tulearensis  Ursch & Leandri (s)
Euphorbia milii var. vulcanii  (Leandri) Ursch & Leandri (s)
Euphorbia millotii  Ursch & Leandri (s)
Euphorbia minbuensis Gage
Euphorbia minuta Loscos & Pard.
Euphorbia minuta ssp. minuta
Euphorbia minuta ssp. moleroi P.Montserrat Recoder & J.V.Ferrández Palacio
Euphorbia minutifolia Boiss.
Euphorbia minutula Boiss.
Euphorbia minxianensis W.T.Wang
Euphorbia mira L.C.Leach (s)
Euphorbia misella S.Watson
Euphorbia misera Benth. (s) - Cliff spurge
Euphorbia missurica Raf.
Euphorbia mitchelliana Boiss.
Euphorbia mitriformis P.R.O.Bally & S.Carter (s)
Euphorbia mixta N.E.Br. (s)
Euphorbia mlanjeana L.C.Leach (s)
Euphorbia mocinoi Oudejans
Euphorbia moehringioides Pax
Euphorbia monacantha Pax (s)
Euphorbia monadenoides M.G.Gilbert (s)
Euphorbia monantha C.Wright ex Boiss.
Euphorbia monchiquensis Franco & P. Silva
Euphorbia monensis (Millsp.) Urb.
Euphorbia mongolica (Prokh.) Prokh.
Euphorbia monostyla (Prokh.) Prokh.
Euphorbia monteiri Hook.f. (s)
Euphorbia monteiri ssp. brandbergensis B.Nord. (s)
Euphorbia monteiri ssp. monteiri (s)
Euphorbia monteiri ssp. ramosa L.C.Leach (s)
Euphorbia montenegrina (Baldacci) Maly
Euphorbia moratii Rauh (s)
Euphorbia moratii var. antsingiensis Cremers (s)
Euphorbia moratii var. bemaharensis Cremers (s)
Euphorbia moratii var. moratii (s)
Euphorbia moratii var. multiflora Rauh (s)
Euphorbia mosaica P.R.O.Bally & S.Carter (s)
Euphorbia mossambicensis  (Klotzsch & Garcke) Boiss.
Euphorbia mossamedensis N.E.Br.
Euphorbia mucronulata (Prokh.) Prokh.
Euphorbia muelleri Boiss.
Euphorbia muirii N.E.Br. (s)
Euphorbia multiceps A.Berger (s)
Euphorbia multiclava P.R.O.Bally & S.Carter (s)
Euphorbia multifida N.E.Br. (s)
Euphorbia multifolia A.C.White, R.A.Dyer & B.Sloane (s)
Euphorbia multifoliosa M.E.Jones
Euphorbia multiformis Hook. & Arn.
Euphorbia multifurcata Rech.f., Aellen & Esfand. ex Rech.f.
Euphorbia multinodis Urb.
Euphorbia multiseta Benth.
Euphorbia mundtii N.E.Br. (s)
Euphorbia munizii Borhidi (s)
Euphorbia muraltioides N.E.Br.
Euphorbia muricata Thunb.
Euphorbia musciola Fernald (s)
Euphorbia musili Velen.
Euphorbia mwinilungensis L.C.Leach (s)
Euphorbia myrioclada S.Carter (s)
Euphorbia myrsinites L. (s) - Creeping spurge, donkey tail, myrtle spurge
Euphorbia myrsinites ssp. myrsinites (s)
Euphorbia myrsinites ssp. pontica (Prokh.) R.Turner (s)
Euphorbia myrsinites ssp. rechingeri (Greuter) Aldén (s)
Euphorbia myrtillifolia L.
Euphorbia myrtoides Boiss.

N

Euphorbia nagleri  (Klotzsch & Garcke ex Klotzsch) Boiss.
Euphorbia namibensis Marloth (s)
Euphorbia namuliensis Bruyns (s)
Euphorbia namuskluftensis L.C.Leach (s)
Euphorbia natalensis Bernh. ex Krauss
Euphorbia nayarensis V.W.Steinm.
Euphorbia nealleyi Coult. & Fisher
Euphorbia nebrownii Merr.
Euphorbia negromontana N.E.Br.
Euphorbia neilmulleri M.C.Johnst.
Euphorbia nematocypha Hand.-Mazz.
Euphorbia neoangolensis Bruyns (s) (= Monadenium angolense)
Euphorbia neoarborescens Bruyns (s) (= Monadenium arborescens)
Euphorbia neobosseri Rauh (s)
Euphorbia neobosseri var. itampolensis Rauh (s)
Euphorbia neobosseri var. neobosseri (s)
Euphorbia neocaledonica Boiss.
Euphorbia neocapitata Bruyns (s) (= Monadenium capitatum)
Euphorbia neococcinea Bruyns (s) (= Monadenium coccineum)
Euphorbia neocrispa Bruyns (s) (= Monadenium crispum)
Euphorbia neocymosa Bruyns (s) (= Synadenium cymosum)
Euphorbia neoerubescens Bruyns (s) (= Lortia erubescens, Monadenium erubescens)
Euphorbia neogillettii Bruyns (s) (= Monadenium gillettii)
Euphorbia neoglabrata Bruyns (s) (= Synadenium glabratum)
Euphorbia neoglaucescens Bruyns (s) (= Synadenium glaucescens)
Euphorbia neogoetzei Bruyns (s) (= Monadenium goetzei)
Euphorbia neogossweileri Bruyns (s) (= Monadenium gossweileri, Endadenium gossweileri)
Euphorbia neogracilis Bruyns (s) (= Monadenium gracile)
Euphorbia neohalipedicola Bruyns (s) (= Synadenium halipedicola)
Euphorbia neohumbertii Boiteau (s)
Euphorbia neomontana Bruyns (s) (= Monadenium montanum)
Euphorbia neoparviflora Bruyns (s) (= Monadenium parviflorum)
Euphorbia neopedunculata Bruyns (s) (= Monadenium pedunculatum)
Euphorbia neopolycnemoides Pax & K.Hoffmann
Euphorbia neoreflexa Bruyns (s) (= Monadenium reflexum)
Euphorbia neorubella Bruyns (s) (= Monadenium montanum var. rubellum,/ Monadenium rubellum)
Euphorbia neorugosa Bruyns (s) (= Monadenium rugosum)
Euphorbia neospinescens Bruyns (s) (= Stenadenium spinescens, Monadenium spinescens)
Euphorbia neostapeliodes Bruyns (s) (= Monadenium stapelioides)
Euphorbia neostapeliodes var. congesta (P.R.O.Bally) Bruyns (s) (= Monadenium stapelioides var. congestum)
Euphorbia neostapeliodes var. neostapeliodes (s) (= Monadenium stapelioides var. stapelioides)
Euphorbia neostolonifera Bruyns (s) (= Monadenium rhizophorum var. stoloniferum, Monadenium stoloniferum)
Euphorbia neovirgata Bruyns (s) (= Monadenium virgatum)
Euphorbia nephradenia  Barneby - Pana spurge
Euphorbia nereidum Jahandiez & Maire
Euphorbia neriifolia L. (s) - Indian spurgetree, hedge euphorbia
Euphorbia nesemannii R.A.Dyer (s)
Euphorbia nevadensis Boiss. & Reut.
Euphorbia nicaeensis All.
Euphorbia nicaeensis ssp. glareosa (Pall. ex M.Bieb.) Radcl.-Sm.
Euphorbia nicaeensis ssp. cadrilateri (Prod.) B.Kuzmanov
Euphorbia nicaeensis ssp. goldei (Prod.) Greuter & Burdet
Euphorbia nicaeensis ssp. lasiocarpa (Boiss.) Radcl.-Sm. & Govaerts
Euphorbia nicaeensis ssp. latibracteata (Prod.) B.Kuzmanov
Euphorbia nicaeensis ssp. maleevii (Tamamshyan) Oudejans
Euphorbia nicaeensis ssp. nicaeensis
Euphorbia nicaeensis ssp. prostrata (Fiori) Arrigoni
Euphorbia nicaeensis ssp. stepposa (Zoz) Greuter & Burdet
Euphorbia nicaeensis ssp. volgensis (Krysht.) Oudejans
Euphorbia nicholasii Oudejans
Euphorbia niciciana Borbás
Euphorbia nigrispina N.E.Br.
Euphorbia nigrispinoides M.G.Gilbert (s)
Euphorbia niqueroana Urb.
Euphorbia nivulia Buch.-Ham. (s)
Euphorbia nocens (L.C.Wheeler) V.W.Steinm.
Euphorbia nodosa Houtt.
Euphorbia nogalensis  (A.Hässl.) S.Carter (s)
Euphorbia norfolkiana Boiss. (s)
Euphorbia normannii Schmalh. ex Lipsky
Euphorbia notoptera Boiss.
Euphorbia novorossica Dubovik
Euphorbia noxia Pax (s)
Euphorbia nubica N.E.Br. (s)
Euphorbia nubigena L.C.Leach (s)
Euphorbia nubigena var. nubigena (s)
Euphorbia nubigena var. rutilans L.C.Leach (s)
Euphorbia nudicaulis  Perr. (s)
Euphorbia nummularia Hook.f.
Euphorbia nutans Lag.
Euphorbia nyassae Pax (s)
Euphorbia nyikae Pax (s)
Euphorbia nyikae var. neovolkensii (Pax) S.Carter (s)
Euphorbia nyikae var. nyikae (s)

O

Euphorbia oatesii Rolfe (s)
Euphorbia oaxacana B.L.Rob. & Greenm. (s)
Euphorbia obconica Bojer ex N.E.Br.
Euphorbia obcordata Balf.f. (s)
Euphorbia obesa Hook.f. (s)
Euphorbia obesa ssp. obesa (s)
Euphorbia obesa ssp. symmetrica  (A.C.White, R.A.Dyer & B.Sloane) G.D.Rowley (s)
Euphorbia oblanceolata Balf.f. (s)
Euphorbia obliqua F.Bauer ex Endl.
Euphorbia oblongata  Griseb - Eggleaf spurge, oblong spurge
Euphorbia oblongifolia (K.Koch) K.Koch
Euphorbia obovata Decne. (s)
Euphorbia obtusata Pursh
Euphorbia occidentaustralica Radcl.-Sm. & Govaerts
Euphorbia ocellata Durand & Hilg.
Euphorbia ocellata ssp. arenicola (Parisch) Oudejans
Euphorbia ocellata ssp. ocellata
Euphorbia ocellata ssp. rattanii (S.Watson) Oudejans
Euphorbia octoradiata H.Lév. & Vaniot ex H.Lév.
Euphorbia ocymoidea L.
Euphorbia odontadenia Boiss.
Euphorbia odontophora S.Carter (s)
Euphorbia oerstediana  (Klotzsch & Garcke ex Klotzsch) Boiss. - West Indian spurge
Euphorbia officinalis Forssk.
Euphorbia officinarum L. (s)
Euphorbia ogadenensis P.R.O.Bally & S.Carter (s)
Euphorbia oidorhiza Pojark.
Euphorbia oligoclada L.C.Leach (s)
Euphorbia olowaluana Sherff Akoko (Island of Hawaii, Maui)
Euphorbia omariana M.G.Gilbert (s)
Euphorbia ophthalmica Rers.
Euphorbia opuntioides Welw. ex Hiern (s)
Euphorbia orabensis Dinter
Euphorbia oranensis (Croizat) Subils
Euphorbia orbiculata Kunth
Euphorbia orbiculifolia S.Carter (s)
Euphorbia orbifolia (Alain) Oudejans
Euphorbia orientalis L.
Euphorbia origanoides L.
Euphorbia orizabae Boiss.
Euphorbia ornithopus Jacq. (s)
Euphorbia orobanchoides (P.R.O.Bally) Bruyns (s) (= Monadenium orobanchoides)
Euphorbia orobanchoides var. calycina (P.R.O.Bally) Bruyns (s) (= Monadenium orobanchoides var. calycinum)
Euphorbia orobanchoides var. orobanchoides (s) (= Monadenium orobanchoides var. orobanchoides)
Euphorbia orphanidis Boiss.
Euphorbia orthoclada Baker (s)
Euphorbia orthoclada ssp. orthoclada (s)
Euphorbia orthoclada ssp. vepretorum  (Drake) Leandri (s)
Euphorbia oryctis Dinter
Euphorbia oschtenica Galushko
Euphorbia osyridae Boiss.
Euphorbia osyridiformis Parsa
Euphorbia otjipembana L.C.Leach (s)
Euphorbia ouachitana Mayfield
Euphorbia ovalleana Phil.
Euphorbia ovata (Klotzsch & Garcke ex Klotzsch) Boiss.
Euphorbia oxycoccoides Boiss.
Euphorbia oxyodonta Boiss. & Hausskn. ex Boiss.
Euphorbia oxyphylla Boiss. (s)
Euphorbia oxystegia Boiss. (s)

Notes

References 
  (2006): A new subgeneric classification for Euphorbia (Euphorbiaceae) in southern Africa based on ITS and psbA-trnH sequence data. Taxon 55(2): 397–420. HTML abstract
 & al. (2010). World Checklist of Malpighiales. The Board of Trustees of the Royal Botanic Gardens.
  (2003): The submersion of Pedilanthus into Euphorbia (Euphorbiaceae). Acta Botanica Mexicana 65: 45-50. PDF fulltext [English with Spanish abstract]
  (2002): Phylogenetic relationships in Euphorbieae (Euphorbiaceae) based on ITS and ndhF sequence data. Annals of the Missouri Botanical Garden 89(4): 453–490.  (HTML abstract, first page image)

External links

Lists
Euphorbia